Michael Redfearn (birth unknown) is a former professional rugby league footballer who played in the 1960s and 1970s. He played at club level for Castleford (Heritage № 494).

Playing career

Challenge Cup Final appearances
Michael Redfearn played left-, i.e. number 11,  in Castleford’s 11-6 victory over Salford in the 1969 Challenge Cup Final during the 1968–69 season at Wembley Stadium, London on Saturday 17 May 1969, in front of a crowd of 97,939, and played right-, i.e. number 10, in the 7-2 victory over Wigan in the 1970 Challenge Cup Final during the 1969–70 season at Wembley Stadium, London on Saturday 9 May 1970, in front of a crowd of 95,255.

County Cup Final appearances
Michael Redfearn played as an interchange/substitute, i.e. number 14, (replacing  Brian Lockwood) in Castleford's 11-22 defeat by Leeds in the 1968 Yorkshire County Cup Final during the 1968–69 season at Belle Vue, Wakefield on Saturday 19 October 1968.

BBC2 Floodlit Trophy Final appearances
Michael Redfearn played right-, i.e. number 12, in Castleford's 8-5 victory over Leigh in the 1967 BBC2 Floodlit Trophy Final during the 1967–68 season at Headingley Rugby Stadium, Leeds on Saturday 16 January 1968.

Club career
Michael Redfearn scored eight 2-point drop goals during his time at Castleford.

References

External links

Search for "Redfearn" at rugbyleagueproject.org

Living people
Castleford Tigers players
English rugby league players
Place of birth missing (living people)
Rugby league second-rows
Year of birth missing (living people)